Paul D. Schreiber Senior High School (commonly Paul D. Schreiber High School or Schreiber High School) is a four-year public high school in Port Washington, in Nassau County, New York, United States. It is operated by the Port Washington Union Free School District.

As of the 2021–22 school year, the school had an enrollment of 1,638 students and 129.9 classroom teachers (on an FTE basis), for a student–teacher ratio of 12.6:1. There were 285 students (17.4% of enrollment) eligible for free lunch and 18 (1.1% of students) eligible for reduced-cost lunch.

Overview 
It is located at 101 Campus Drive, in Nassau County, New York on the North Shore of Long Island. The school was originally constructed in 1953 and is named after a former superintendent. Schreiber High School is one of the top public high schools on Long Island. U.S. News & World Report awarded Schreiber a gold medal in its 2014 rankings. In 2015, it was ranked as the 283rd best high school in the United States by U.S. News & World Report, with a student/teacher ratio of 13:1.

Notable alumni include Kenny Albert, Craig Thomas, and Anthony Scaramucci.

Academics
The school offers 26 Advanced Placement classes, more than three times the state average that's there. The Advanced Placement exam pass rate is 83%, meaning that 83% of students attain a score of 3 or higher on the AP exam, compared to the state average of 61%, and more than half of the student body, 53%, takes at least one Advanced Placement exam, compared to the state average of 16%. In 2022, 75% of students took at least one Advanced Placement exam.

In 2011, Mandarin Chinese was added as a fifth language to the foreign language curriculum, joining Latin, French, Spanish, and Italian.  Mandarin could be taken only in conjunction with another of the aforementioned languages or after completion of a three-year language sequence.  After the conclusion of the 2014–15 school year, Chinese was dropped from the list of course of offerings following budget reallocation.

Athletics

Sports 
Schreiber High School is part of the Section VIII (8) New York State Public High School Athletic Association (NYSPHAA). As such, it competes against other public schools in Nassau County, New York in: baseball, basketball, bowling, badminton, cross country, field hockey, football, golf, lacrosse, soccer, softball, swimming, track and field, tennis, volleyball, and wrestling.

Boys' cross country 
From 2007 to 2009, the Vikings won three consecutive class AA Nassau County championship titles. Furthermore, the team finished third in class AA and seventh overall in the 2009 state meet. In 2016, the Vikings were also AAA Nassau County champions. The Vikings went back to back as County champions in 2021 (Spring) and 2021 (Fall).

Football 
In October 2012, the Vikings defeated Jericho High School in the Conference V Finals, capping off a 7–1 season.

Girls' tennis 
In November 2008, the girls varsity tennis team beat previously defeated Westhampton Beach High School in the Long Island Championship. This marked the second straight year that the team won the title, becoming the first team to repeat as champions.

Boys' baseball 
In 2017, the varsity team lost to Hicksville in the first round of the New York State Section VIII playoffs.

Boys' basketball 

ESPN Radio and Dan LeBatard Show with Stugotz personality and alumnus Jon "Stugotz" Weiner once set the Long Island record for most successful three-pointers in a half, with 6.

Men's soccer 
In 2018, the varsity soccer team won the Nassau County Championship against Massapequa High School and Long Island Championships against Walt Whitman High School. They proceeded to the New York State semi-finals, where they would lose to Clarence High School of Erie County. Although seeded second lowest in the county, they managed to beat the 1, 3, and 5 seed, as well as state ranked Walt Whitman and Syosset High School.

Mascot 
The mascot is a blue and white with yellow only in the hair Viking head. It is often compared to the Viking head used by the Minnesota Vikings of the National Football League.

Academic teams

Academic decathlon 
Schreiber's Academic Decathlon team was New York State's winning team from 1997 to 1998 and again from 2000 to 2004. They placed second in 2005, their first time not attending the national competition in eight years.

Recently, in the NYS competition for Nationals, the 2008 team came in second place while the 2010 team came in third.

Debate 
Schreiber's Lincoln–Douglas debate team was nationally dominant from 2003 to 2005, with three students capturing several national titles. The team has since transformed into a Public Forum Debate team, winning the Varsity Public Forum New York State Championship in 2009. In April 2011, the team came in second place in Public Forum at the New York State Championship. Schreiber's debate team is once again successful, achieving exemplary results at the Princeton Classic since 2016.

Mock trial 
The school's Mock Trial team competes in the annual New York State High School Mock Trial Tournament. Schreiber won the Long Island Region of the state tournament in 1991 and 1996.

In the 2008 competition, the team advanced to the Round of 16 in the regional tournament. The team advanced to the county championship in 2007.

Other clubs
Schreiber offers a wide range of clubs including: 
 Across the Aisle
 All Elite Wrestling Fan Club
 Bridging the Gap
 Chess Club
 Drama Club
 FBLA
Full SupPort
 GSA
 Key Club
 “Haven’t You Heard”
 Mu Alpha Theta
 Mathletes
 Model United Nations
 National Art Honor Society
 National Honors Society
 Quiz Bowl Team
 Robotics Club* 
SADD
 Science National Honor Society
 Science Olympiad Team
 Student Council
 Tri-M
 Natural Helpers Club
 iCulture Club

Schreiber offered a total of 46 clubs for the 2014–15 school year.

Music

The school features multiple bands, orchestras and choruses. In recent years, members of the various ensembles have been chosen to perform in select groups, including the All-State orchestra and band. For the 2008–09 school year, 11 Schreiber students were chosen as All-State musicians and alternates.
In the 2010–11 year, 5 students were selected as the All-State musicians and alternates, and one year later 8 students were selected.

The school marching band has praiseworthy achievements as well. The marching band has performed and marched in the Sugar Bowl Parade (1989), Orange Bowl Parade (1990), and the Tournament of Roses Parade (1996).

In May 2000, the Schreiber Concert Band performed and won several awards at a high school band tournament in Hershey, PA. During the next school year, in the fall of 2000, the Paul D. Schreiber Marching Band performed the piece "Seventy-Six Trombones" from the musical The Music Man at the tenth annual Lauri Strauss Leukemia Foundation Benefit Concert at Carnegie Hall.

Research program
Schreiber has a nationally recognized research program in Mathematics, Science, and Social Science. There have been numerous local and national winners from the school's research program. Students compete in a variety of competitions including the Siemens Competition, Long Island Science and Engineering Fair, and Intel International Science and Engineering Fair.

The school's research program has attained nationwide recognition through student success in the Intel Science Talent Search competition. From 2002 to 2010, the school had the sixth most semifinalists in the nation with 50, trailing only Montgomery Blair High School (108), Stuyvesant High School (103), Ward Melville High School (85), Thomas Jefferson High School for Science and Technology (75), and Bronx High School of Science (59).

Recent years 
In January 2008, the school produced six Intel Science Talent Search semifinalists, the second highest total on Long Island. Additionally, two finalists were selected from the school. Schreiber was only one of two schools that produced double finalist winners. Along with Great Neck North High School, Schreiber produced the second most finalists in the country, trailing only Stuyvesant High School of Manhattan. A student from Schreiber was selected to be one of the top ten winners of the Intel Science Talent Search 2008, winning a scholarship of $20,000. The student was the ninth-place winner for a zoology project based on Odonate populations.

Eight Intel Science Talent Search semifinalists were selected from Schreiber in 2006, tying for the second most semifinalists in the nation with Stuyvesant High School. The achievement of the semifinalists marks the fourth consecutive year that Schreiber High School has been in the top five schools in the United States. That year, Schreiber also produced one finalist in the competition, who ended up winning the Glenn Seaborg award.

2000 
In 2000, nine semifinalists were selected, leading all schools on Long Island. Schreiber ranked fifth nationally and second among comprehensive high schools. Furthermore, three students were chosen as finalists, leading all schools in the country.

Ultimately, a student from Schreiber won first place in the competition for her steganography project. She encrypted a message in the gene sequence of a DNA strand.

Regeneron STS results by year

School publications

Newspaper 
Schreiber's premier student publication is The Schreiber Times. The newspaper was first established in 1924 at the original Port Washington High School as The Port Weekly. The newspaper now publishes 24 page monthly issues that include sections about News, Features, Opinions, Arts and Entertainment, and Sports. The newspaper has also been recognized for its artwork and covers.

The Schreiber Times has won awards for each of its five sections from well-acclaimed sources, including the Long Island newspaper Newsday, the American Scholastic Press Association, the Columbia Scholastic Press Association, and the Empire State School Press Association.

In 2012, The Schreiber Times launched an online version of the print paper. There is as an archive of all issues of The Schreiber Times and The Port Weekly published since 1924.

Literary magazine 
Another publication, Kaleidoscope, is a literary magazine featuring the poetry, prose, artwork, and photography of Schreiber students. It has won various awards, including two silver medals in the Columbia Scholastic Press Association's Medallist Critiques in both 2010 and 2011.

Yearbook 
The school also produces an annual yearbook. This yearbook is compiled by students with the aid of a faculty adviser and is called the Port Light.

Notable alumni

 Kenny Albert (class of 1986) – television sportscaster
 John Cassavetes (class of 1947) - Academy Award-nominated director, writer and actor best known for the films Rosemary's Baby and A Woman Under the Influence
 John Fasano (class of 1979) – Hollywood screenwriter, film producer and director
 Ellen V. Futter (class of 1967) - President, American Museum of Natural History
 Bob Griffin (class of 1968) - American-Israeli basketball player, and English Literature professor
 Craig M. Johnson (class of 1989) – former New York State Senator
 Frederick M. Lawrence (class of 1973) – 8th President of Brandeis University
 Jordan Laws (class of 1998) – Grammy Award-winning producer for Christina Aguilera  "Back To Basics" album in 2006
 David Lobell (class of 1996) – Associate Professor in Environmental Earth System Science at Stanford University and 2013 recipient of the MacArthur Genius Grant
 Katie Lowes (born 1982, class of 1980), actress and theater director, best known for her roles in the ABC political drama series Scandal and the Netflix drama series Inventing Anna
 Paul Zane Pilzer (class of 1971) – economist
 Anthony Scaramucci (class of 1982) – host of "Wall Street Week" on Fox Business, founder of the SALT Conference, founder of SkyBridge Capital, and, briefly, former Communications Director for President Donald Trump
 Stugotz (class of 1991) –  sports talk radio host
 Jeanine Tesori – Drama Desk Award for Outstanding Music winning composer
 Craig Thomas (class of 1993) – co-creator of How I Met Your Mother
 Bob Verdi – journalist, Chicago Blackhawks team historian
 Mark Wood (class of 1975) – violinist, musical instrument designer

See also
 Port Washington Union Free School District
 Port Washington, New York
 Advanced Placement
 Sands Point, New York
 Manorhaven, New York

References

External links
 Official Webpage
 WDOT Portnet Radio — Schreiber H.S. radio station
 
 
 
 
 

Public high schools in New York (state)
Schools in Nassau County, New York
Educational institutions established in 1953
1953 establishments in New York (state)